NRAM may refer to:

 Nano-RAM, a proprietary computer memory technology 
 Landmark Mortgages, formerly NRAM plc, a British asset holding and management company